Hovatter is an unincorporated community in Tucker County, West Virginia, United States.

The community was named after Christopher Hovatter, a pioneer settler.

References 

Unincorporated communities in West Virginia
Unincorporated communities in Tucker County, West Virginia